Second mile may refer to:

 2nd Mile, an American Christian rock and worship band from Gladwin, Michigan
 The Second Mile, a former nonprofit organization founded in 1977 by Jerry Sandusky